Field hockey events were contested at the 1994 Asian Games in Hiroshima, Japan.

Medalists

Medal table

Results

Men

Preliminary round

Group A

Group B

5th–8th placings

Semifinals

7th placing

5th placing

Final round

Semifinals

Bronze medal match

Final

Final standing

Women

References
 Men's Results
 Women's Results

 
1994 Asian Games events
1994
Asian Games
1994 Asian Games